Shirlene Coelho (born 19 February 1981) is a Paralympian athlete. She competed in the T37 javelin throw, discus throw and shot put at the 2008, 2012 and 2016 Paralympics. At the 2016 Rio Paralympic games, she won a gold medal in Women's Javelin F37 and won a silver medal in Women's Discus Throw F38. At the 2012 London Paralympic games, she won a gold medal at the Women's Javelin F37/38 event. At the 2008 Beijing Paralympic games, she won a silver medal at the Women's Javelin F35-38.

References

External links

 

1981 births
Living people
Paralympic athletes of Brazil
Paralympic gold medalists for Brazil
Paralympic silver medalists for Brazil
World record holders in Paralympic athletics
Medalists at the 2008 Summer Paralympics
Medalists at the 2012 Summer Paralympics
Medalists at the 2016 Summer Paralympics
Athletes (track and field) at the 2008 Summer Paralympics
Athletes (track and field) at the 2012 Summer Paralympics
Athletes (track and field) at the 2016 Summer Paralympics
Paralympic medalists in athletics (track and field)
Brazilian female shot putters
Brazilian female discus throwers
Brazilian female javelin throwers
Medalists at the 2007 Parapan American Games
Medalists at the 2011 Parapan American Games
Medalists at the 2015 Parapan American Games
Sportspeople from Mato Grosso do Sul
20th-century Brazilian women
21st-century Brazilian women